Twelve Nudes is the fifth solo studio album by Ezra Furman. It was released on August 30, 2019, through Bella Union.

Development 
The album takes its name from a series of meditations by Anne Carson "on the intense pain we deal with in life". Furman was inspired to create Twelve Nudes by her anger at the perceived injustices of the Trump administration and late capitalism, as well as her Jewish and transgender identities.

Critical reception

According to Metacritic, Twelve Nudes has a score of 80 out of 100, indicating that it has received "generally favorable" reviews from critics.

Track listing

Charts

References

2019 albums
Bella Union albums
Ezra Furman albums